Hinder is a surname. Notable people with the surname include: 

Anna Hinderer (1827–1870), British missionary to Nigeria
Frank Hinder (1906–1992), Australian painter, sculptor and art teacher
Jayson Hinder (1965–2017), Australian lawyer and politician
Margel Hinder (1906–1995), Australian-American sculptor
Paul Hinder (born 1942), Catholic bishop
Roman Hinderer (1668–1744), German Jesuit missionary in China
Russell Hinder (born 1979), Australian basketball player